Gerdau is the largest producer of long steel in the Americas, with steel mills in Brazil, Argentina, Canada, Colombia, Dominican Republic, Mexico, Peru, United States, Uruguay and Venezuela. Currently, Gerdau has an installed capacity of 26 million metric tons of steel per year and offers steel for the civil construction, automobile, industrial, agricultural and various sectors.

Gerdau is also the world's 30th largest steelmaker. It has 337 industrial and commercial units and more than 30,000 employees across 10 countries.

History

Gerdau was founded by Johannes Heinrich Kaspar Gerdau, also known as João Gerdau, a German migrant who left the port of Hamburg for Rio Grande do Sul, in Brazil, in 1869 in search of new business opportunities. He arrived at the port of Rio Grande, Rio Grande do Sul and, at only 20 years of age, established himself in Colônia de Santo Ângelo (now the town of Agudo), where he invested in trade, transport and the subdivision of land. He moved to the town of Cachoeira do Sul in 1884, where he founded an important General Store. Always seeking new opportunities, João Gerdau moved again, this time to Porto Alegre, with his wife Alvine Gerdau and his three children, Hugo, Walter and Bertha. There he went into industry, buying the Pontas de Paris Nail Factory in 1901 marking the entry into steel industry.

Curt Johannpeter's entry into the Gerdau family marked the beginning of a new direction for the company. Born in Germany in 1899, Curt Johannpeter made his career in finance. In 1922 he began to work for the German Transatlantic Bank, a subsidiary of Deutsche Bank. In 1930 he became the branch inspector for Portugal, Spain and Latin America, and in the same year was introduced to the young Helda Gerdau during a trip to Brazil. They married and had four sons: Germano, Klaus, Jorge and Frederico.  In 1946, Johannpeter took the wheel of the Gerdau company and oversaw a critical phase in its expansion.

See history of Gerdau

Today
Gerdau's core business is to transform steel scrap and iron ore into steel products.

Gerdau is a leading producer of long steel in the Americas and one of the largest suppliers of special steel in the world. It is the largest recycler in Latin America and around the world it transforms, each year, millions of metric tons of scrap into steel, reinforcing its commitment to sustainable development in the regions where it operates. With more than 140,000 shareholders, the company is listed on the stock exchanges of São Paulo, New York and Madrid.

Its operations are based on the integrated regional market mill concept by which raw materials are bought from nearby suppliers and products are primarily sold in the same region. This brand of by-product synergy led to the acquisition of Chaparral Steel in 2007, a company which has been noted for creating interchange between head management and workers and deliberately employs a maximum of 1000 people (the size of a village). Gerdau operates through three different processes:

Mini mills
Integrated mills
Direct reduced iron plant

Products and services
Gerdau produces long carbon steel, long special steel, flat steel and forged and cast parts. These products are used in different sectors, such as industry, metallurgy, farming and livestock, civil construction, automotive industries, petrochemicals, railway and naval sectors, in addition to orthodontic, medical and food areas. Gerdau is also the main supplier of specialty steel for the international automotive network.

Internationalization of the Gerdau Group
Long before its possibilities of expansion on the Brazilian market were exhausted, Gerdau had established strategies for external expansion, starting at the end of the 1970s. Their fundamental objectives were to conquer the U.S. market. Based on limited international experience managing a mini mill plant in Uruguay for almost a decade, the group first aimed at the North American market for long steel, starting with Canada. Later, after a decade of experience in conditions that were radically different from those existing in Uruguay (the location of its first foreign venture), Gerdau entered the U.S. market. Entry
into North America was complemented by other ventures in all of Latin America, from Chile and Argentina to Mexico and the Caribbean. The North American experience, like the Brazilian, demonstrated the strategic necessity to enter new markets such as Europe (with special steels) and Asia (with long steel and final structures of special steel).

Business operations
Gerdau is spread globally across 13 countries with its integrated and semi-integrated steel mills. Apart from steel mills, Gerdau also has downstream processing facilities.

Offices:
Gerdau has its major offices at Porto Alegre, São Paulo, Tampa, Whitby, Polanco, Lima, Caracas, Bogota, Jackson and Bangalore.

Brazil Business Division:
Gerdau has two Brazil business divisions divided as Mining Americas and Steel Brazil

Special Steel Business Division:
Gerdau produces specialty steel especially for the automotive industry through its special steel divisions, Special Steel North America, Special Steel Brazil, and Special Steel India.

Latin America Business Division:
Gerdau produces most of the long and flat products at Latin America North, Colombia, Mexico, Sizuca (Venezuela), Latin America South, Argentina, Chile, Peru and Uruguay

Assets

 58 steel mill factories
 21 downstream operations
 94 fabricated reinforcing steel facilities
 4 flat steel service centers
 80 retail facilities
 32 scrap collection and processing facilities
 4 iron ore extraction areas
 2 solid pig iron production units
 2 private port terminals
 1 Reinforcing Steel Placing Company

Carbon footprint
Gerdau reported Total CO2e emissions (Direct + Indirect) for 31 December 2020 at 11,281 Kt (-667 /-5.6% y-o-y).

See also

 Industrias Nacionales
 List of steel producers

References

Further reading
 Werlang, William. A Família de Johannes Heinrich Kaspar Gerdau: Um estudo de caso sobre an industrialização no sul do Brasil Dissertação de Mestrado defendida em 1999. MILA. UFSM

External links
 Gerdau Group homepage
 Gerdau Ameristeel
 History of Gerdau

Brazilian brands
Defence companies of Brazil
Companies listed on the New York Stock Exchange
Steel companies of Brazil
Companies listed on B3 (stock exchange)
Companies based in Rio Grande do Sul
Multinational companies headquartered in Brazil
Manufacturing companies established in 1901
Companies listed on the Madrid Stock Exchange
1901 establishments in Brazil
Economy of Porto Alegre
Gerdau family